Collection is an album by Thee Michelle Gun Elephant, released in 2001.

This release was for North America only. Around the same time, in Japan, the band released 'TMGE 106', which contained similar (although not identical) tracks.

Track listing 
 "Pinhead Cramberry Dance"
 "Young Jaguar"
 "Hi! China"
 "Smokin' Billy"
 "Lily"
 "Out Blues"
 "Why Do You Want To Shake?"
 "Blue Nylon Shirts (From Balcony)"
 "Black Tambourine"
 "Boogie"
 "The Birdmen"
 "Baby, Please Go Home"
 "Vibe On!"
 "Revolver Junkies"
 "World's End (Primitive Version)
 "GT 400"
 "Cisco"

Thee Michelle Gun Elephant albums
2001 albums
Alive Naturalsound Records albums